Club Deportivo Corporación Arturo Fernández Vial is a football club in Chile, from the Concepción area, in the Bio-Bio Region. The team was founded on June 3, 1903, and they currently play in the second level of Chilean football, the Primera B.

Arturo Fernández Vial identifies itself since its beginning with the national corporation of railroad workers, and it was the most popular team in southern Chile. Its traditional rival is Deportes Concepción. Also, the team's "hinchada" (die-hard supporters) are known as La Furia Guerrera.

History
In the year 1897, the football club Internacional de Concepción was founded. This predecessor institution reunited the local residents that worked for the State Railway at the time.

In May 1903, a strike was declared by the harbor workers in the city of Valparaíso which unchained violent scenes in the city, even bringing it to a state of street curfew. In the midst of the deliberations, admiral Arturo Fernández Vial, ex director of Territorio Marítimo (Maritime Territory) and survivor of the Battle of Iquique, decided to intervene before court, trying to settle the problem, and achieving such goal.

Such an act generated admiration, and because of his work, the football club Internacional decided on June 15 of 1903, change its name to Club Deportivo Ferroviario Almirante Arturo Fernández Vial.

The team Vial stood out since its beginning by its high degree of organization. It had its own field right next to the Bio-Bio riverbank, in the area known as Chepe. Its statutes accepted members from all nationalities, but Chileans were preferred. The membership fee was of two Chilean pesos at the time and a monthly fee of one peso. As for its clothing, it had yellow soccer cleats, black short socks, special shin guards, white pants, a sealing wax belt, a striped black and white jersey, and a cap of the same color. In the beginning, Internacional was like a miniature Colo-Colo, a great diffuser of football between the years 1897 and 1903, promoting this sport mainly in the towns near Concepción.

The first great victory for the máquina aurinegra (yellow and black locomotive) came in 1910, in a historical match that took place in the 120 stop of the old trams that went from Concepción through Talcahuano, the vialinos ended the regional dominance of until then undefeated Concepción United. That afternoon, the loud whistles from the steam locomotives deafened the city's downtown.

In the year 1981, Vial decides to play in the newly created Tercera División (Third Division) becoming champions and obtaining promotion to Chile's Segunda Division (Second Division). With almost the same squad, Vial repeats the deed the following season and becomes champion of the Second Division in 1982 with 56 points; this milestone helps make the southern dreams come true.  After 80 years, Club Ferroviario Almirante Arturo Fernández Vial (the most popular institution in the southern side of Chile) makes their debut on the Chilean First Division and it is the first team in the history of the national football league to go from Third Division to First Division in two years.  Up to now, no other professional football club has done such accomplishment.

Nowadays, Vial is going through hard economical issues that are affecting the team's performance. Nevertheless, with the team playing in Chile's lower levels for the last 20 years, without achieving anything important, the passion from its small but loyal fanbase hasn't perished. Its fans sustain the club, not without difficulties. The team's biggest support throughout these years of uncertainty has come from the hinchada (supporters).

Uniform
 Home Uniform: Yellow Jersey with vertical black stripes, black shorts, black socks.
 Away Uniform: Black Jersey, black shorts, black socks.

Stadium
Estadio Municipal de Concepción Alcaldesa Ester Roa, located in Concepción, Chile.

Current squad

2021 Winter Transfers

In

Out

National honours

League Titles
 Segunda División (II): 1
1982
 Tercera División (III): 1
1981
 Tercera División A (IV): 1
2013

Cup Titles
Apertura Tercera División (Fourth Level): 1
2013

See also
Chilean football league system

References

External links
 Official website 
 Unofficial website 

Fernandez Vial
Fernandez Vial
Sport in Biobío Region
1903 establishments in Chile
Concepción, Chile